Camagüey is the largest of the provinces of Cuba.  Its capital is Camagüey.  Other towns include Florida and Nuevitas.

Geography
Camagüey is mostly low lying, with no major hills or mountain ranges passing through the province. Numerous large cays (including what used to be one of Fidel Castro's favourite fishing spots; the Archipiélago Jardines de la Reina) characterize the southern coasts, while the northern coast is lined by Jardines del Rey of the Sabana-Camagüey Archipelago.

Sandy beaches are found on both coasts also, and despite a large potential for tourism, the province has seen little development in that area with the exception of Santa Lucía beach, on the province's North coast.

Economy
The economy of the Camagüey province is primarily cattle and sugar (in the north and south) farming, and the province is known for its cowboy culture, with rodeos frequently held. Chickens and rice are also farmed, and a small citrus fruit industry exists. The capital city also has one of the few breweries on the island.

Municipalities 

Source: Population from 2004 Census. Area from 1976 municipal re-distribution.

References

Further reading

External links

 Portal Camagüey

 
Provinces of Cuba